Niel Beukes (born 14 February 2002) is a South African rugby union player for the  in the Currie Cup. His regular position is centre.

Beukes was named in the  squad for the 2021 Currie Cup Premier Division.

References

South African rugby union players
2002 births
Living people
Rugby union centres
Blue Bulls players